Telurips peruvianus is a species of moth of the family Tortricidae. It is found in Peru.

References

Moths described in 1988
Euliini
Moths of South America
Taxa named by Józef Razowski